Thomas Mood Marchant III (born October 19, 1940) was an American politician in the state of South Carolina. He served in the South Carolina House of Representatives as a member of the Republican Party from 1972 to 1986, representing Greenville County, South Carolina. He was Director of Special Projects at a local manufacturing company.

References

1940 births
Living people
People from Greenville, South Carolina
Businesspeople from South Carolina
Republican Party members of the South Carolina House of Representatives